The Victoria's Secret Fashion Show is an annual fashion show sponsored by Victoria's Secret, a brand of lingerie and sleepwear. Victoria's Secret uses the show to promote and market its goods in high-profile settings. The show features some of the world's leading fashion models, such as current Victoria's Secret Angels Heidi Klum, Alessandra Ambrosio, Miranda Kerr, Doutzen Kroes, and Marisa Miller. Candice Swanepoel, Rosie Huntington-Whiteley, Erin Heatherton, Lindsay Ellingson, and Behati Prinsloo were also featured. Adriana Lima was absent this year due to her pregnancy. Adriana gave birth to her daughter 4 days before to the show.

The 14th fashion show featured some of the new Angels and also the returning Angels. There was a special performance by The Black Eyed Peas, and the show was hosted by Heidi Klum.

Fashion show segments

Segment 1: Star Trooper

Segment 2: All Aboard

Segment 3: PINK Planet

Special Performance

Segment 4: Enchanted Forest

Segment 5: Romantic Journey

Finale 

Doutzen Kroes and Heidi Klum led the finale.

Index

External links 

 VSFS 2009 Gallery
 The Victoria's Secret Fashion Show 2009 on YouTube

Victoria's Secret
2009 in fashion